This list of governors of Kasaï includes governors or equivalent officeholders of the Congo-Kasaï/Kongo-Kasaï province established in the Belgian Congo in 1918.
On 1 October 1933 it was split into the Lusambo and Léopoldville provinces.
Lusambo included the Kasaï and Sankuru districts of Congo-Kasaï and parts of the Léopold II District (Équateur) and Lomami District (Katanga).
On 27 May 1947 Lusambo was renamed Kasaï, which became an autonomous province of the Congo republic on 30 June 1960. 

On 14 August 1962 Kasaï was divided into five new provinces: Lomami, Luluabourg, Sankuru, Sud-Kasaï and Unité Kasaïenne.
On 25 April 1966 Luluabourg and Unité Kasaïenne were united to form Kasaï-Occidental, while Lomami, Sankuru, and Sud-Kasaï were united in the new province of Kasaï-Oriental.
Kasaï-Occidental was split in 2015 into the Kasaï-Central and Kasaï provinces.

Congo-Kasaï (1922–1932)

The governors (or equivalent) of Congo-Kasaï Province were:

Lusambo (1933–1947)

The governors (or equivalent) of Lusambo Province were:

Kasaï (1947–1962)

The governors (or equivalent) of Kasaï Province were:

See also

List of governors of Kasaï-Occidental
List of governors of Kasaï Oriental Province
Lists of provincial governors of the Democratic Republic of the Congo

References

Governors of provinces of the Democratic Republic of the Congo